The mayor of Raleigh is the mayor of Raleigh, the state capital of North Carolina, in the United States.  Raleigh operates with council-manager government, under which the mayor is elected separately from Raleigh City Council, of which they are the eighth member.

Under Raleigh's original 1795 charter, the equivalent of a mayor was the 'Intendant of Police' (a title borrowed from France).  The first person to hold the office was John Haywood.  He was elected by the city Board of Commissioners (who were themselves appointed by the North Carolina General Assembly).  Starting in 1803, intendants were elected annually by all free men owning land within the city limits, including free African-Americans.

The current mayor is Democrat Mary-Ann Baldwin, who was first elected in 2019. The longest-serving mayors in Raleigh's history are Avery C. Upchurch, who was in office for ten years between 1983 and 1993, and Charles Meeker, who served from 2001 through 2011.  Four mayors have served for eight years.

Elections are held every two years.  A nonpartisan blanket primary is held in October.  If no candidate receives more than 50% of the vote, the two candidates that received the most votes progress to the general election run-off election in November.  In 2009, for the first time, the election was nonpartisan, in that the candidates did not have formal party affiliation denoted on the ballot.  Incumbent Charles Meeker won 62% in the first round, making a run-off election unnecessary.

See also
 List of mayors of Raleigh, North Carolina

Footnotes